Centrolene hybrida is a species of frog in the family Centrolenidae.
It is endemic to Colombia.
Its natural habitats are subtropical or tropical moist montane forests and rivers.
It is not considered threatened by the IUCN.

References

hybrida
Amphibians of Colombia
Taxonomy articles created by Polbot
Amphibians described in 1991